Cherry Hill Park is the third studio album by Billy Joe Royal released in 1969, four years after his hit album Down in the Boondocks.

The song "Cherry Hill Park" hit #15 on The Billboard Hot 100.  The album landed on The Billboard 200 chart, reaching #100 in 1970.

Track listing 
All tracks composed by Buddy Buie and James B. Cobb, Jr.; except where indicated
 "You Can't Manufacture Love" (Marc Mathis, William Dees)
 "Mama Song"
 "Helping Hand"
 "Ain't It the Truth"
 "Down Home Lovin" (Billy Gilmore, Robert Nix)
 "Cherry Hill Park" (Billy Gilmore, Robert Nix)
 "Burning a Hole"
 "If I Had It to Do Again"
 "Pick Up the Pieces" (Billy Gilmore, Robert Nix)
 "You Can Make Me Feel Good" (Billy Gilmore, Emory Gordy, Jr., Robert Nix)
 "Children" (Joe South)

References

1969 albums
Billy Joe Royal albums
Albums produced by Buddy Buie
Columbia Records albums